Margaret Semple  (née McNair, 1876–3 September 1967) was a New Zealand socialist and local politician. She was married to Bob Semple, a Labour Party Cabinet Minister.

Biography

Early life
Margaret was born in 1876 to Thomas and Agnes McNair who both emigrated from Lanarkshire, Scotland to Otago, New Zealand. Her mother died in 1887 after which her father took the family to Victoria, Australia. Margaret married Bob Semple, a coal miner and unionist, at Outtrim, Victoria, on 27 June 1898. She gave birth to their first child a year later. The Semples initially lived in Western Australia, but when Margaret fell sick, they had to return to Victoria. She was friends with Margaret Thorn who labelled her a "capable woman" referring to how she almost solely raised her children whilst her husband was away on union or political matters. Thorn recalled a story where a girl accidentally cut off two of her fingers only for Semple to sew them back on with thread for a full recovery.

Political career
Semple served as president of the Wellington women's branch of the Labour Party, and was  a member of the party national executive from 1930 to 1943. Semple was elected as a Wellington City Councillor in 1938. She lost her seat in 1941, an election which saw all Labour councillors unseated. She was also a long serving member of the Hospital Board, sitting on it from 1933 until 1941. Historians have argued that her own political contributions between the 1910s and 1940s were considerable, though heavily overshadowed by her husband's, who himself seldom acknowledged her efforts in any depth.

Semple died in 1967 aged 91, Bob had died in 1955. She was survived by her four children, 8 grandchildren, 16 great-grandchildren and 1 great-great-grandchild.

Notes

External links

References

1876 births
1967 deaths
New Zealand trade unionists
20th-century New Zealand women politicians
20th-century New Zealand politicians
New Zealand Labour Party politicians
Wellington City Councillors
Wellington Hospital Board members
New Zealand justices of the peace